Willi Kurt Rössler (12 February 1924 – 2 October 2007) was a German fencer who competed for Saar at the 1952 Summer Olympics. He fenced in the team sabre event.

See also
 Saar at the 1952 Summer Olympics

References

External links
 

1924 births
2007 deaths
German male fencers
Olympic fencers of Saar
Fencers at the 1952 Summer Olympics